Ravenor Nicholson (born 6 October 1943) is a former South African cricketer, who played four seasons of first-class cricket for Natal cricket team. A right-handed batsman and medium pace bowler, his only first-class half century was 89 not out for Natal B against Transvaal B in December 1967. Nicholson's best bowling came in the following match against Griqualand West, taking five wickets in each innings, finishing with match figures of 10/63. Nicholson is the cousin of Test match brothers Peter and Graeme Pollock. His brother Christopher played one first-class match for South African Universities in 1967.

He was born in Durban, Natal.

References

External links

1943 births
Living people
South African cricketers
KwaZulu-Natal cricketers
Cricketers from Durban